Club Deportivo Colindres is a Spanish football team based in Colindres, in the autonomous community of Cantabria. Founded in May 1922 it currently plays in Tercera División RFEF – Group 3, holding home games at Campo de Fútbol del Carmen, which has a capacity of 2,500 spectators.

Season to season

10 seasons in Tercera División
1 season in Tercera División RFEF

Honours
Regional Preferente: 2012–13

External links
Official website 
Futbolme team profile 
Arefe Regional team profile 

Football clubs in Cantabria
Association football clubs established in 1922
1922 establishments in Spain